Stanislav Neumann (16 July 1902 – 19 February 1975) was a Czech actor. He appeared in more than ninety films from 1930 to 1973.

Selected filmography

References

External links 

1902 births
1975 deaths
Czech male film actors